"" (A boy is born for us) is a Gregorian chant, the  introit for Christmas Day. Thomas Tallis wrote a Christmas mass on the chant.

Text 
The text of the antiphon is taken from Isaiah 9:6, while the psalm verse is verse 1 from Psalm 98, "Sing a new song to the Lord".

Musical settings 
The melody was used by composers in contrafacta such as the Christmas mass by Thomas Tallis.

References

External links 
 Puer natus est nobis hymnarium.de
 Puer natus est nobis kathpedia.com
 Puer natus est nobis toddtarantino.com 

Christmas music
Christian chants
Latin-language Christian hymns
Latin religious words and phrases